Bleien Radio Observatory is a radio astronomy observatory located halfway between Zurich and Bern in Switzerland. Its focus is on large bandwidth radio spectroscopy. The observatory is near the village of Bleien, 5 km south of Gränichen in the Canton of Aargau. The place is in a shallow valley that is relatively well protected against terrestrial interference.

History 
The observatory was built in 1979 by the Institute for Astronomy at ETH Zurich under the guidance of Prof. Dr. Arnold O. Benz. Since that time it consists of two parabolic antennae of 7 m and 5 m diameter separated by 100 m and a lab building containing the spectrometers and other electronics. For the first time, a fully digitized and remotely controlled receiver was used. Frequency-agile spectrometers were applied initially. Now digital filter banks and FFT (Fast Fourier transform) spectrometers are in operation. The initial frequency range of 100 - 1000 MHz was enlarged to 10 MHz - 5 GHz. This range is the largest for solar radio observations since 2005. Starting in 2014, the observatory is being converted to observe preferentially non-solar radiation of extragalactic and cosmological origin.

Science
The primary goal was the observation of radio emissions of solar flares. The most significant contribution was the survey and classification at decimeter wavelength (ultra high frequency). The data are crucial for investigating the acceleration of energetic electrons in solar flares. The broad bandwidth was also used to study non-solar radio emissions of gamma-ray bursts and to search for fast radio bursts, transients of possibly extragalactic origin.

The solar data since 1979 and the instrument descriptions are stored at the Institute of 4D Technologies at Fachhochschule Nordwestschweiz FHNW in Windisch and are public. The Bleien Radio Observatory was the starting point of the international e-CALLISTO network that surveys solar activity and space weather 24 hours per day in radio waves.

References

Radio telescopes
Solar observatories
ETH Zurich
Astronomical observatories in Switzerland